Benjamin England (1647–1711) was an English politician who was a Member of Parliament for Great Yarmouth in Norfolk from 1702 to 1709.

References 

1647 births
1711 deaths
English MPs 1702–1705
English MPs 1705–1707
British MPs 1707–1708
British MPs 1708–1710
People from Great Yarmouth